General Sir Roger Cochrane Wilson   (26 December 1882 – 5 February 1966) was a senior British Indian Army officer who went on to be Military Secretary to the India Office.

Early life and education
Wilson was born in 1882, the son of Colonel Frederick Alexander Wilson, who was also an officer in the British Indian Army, and Louisa Agnes Marshall. He attended Wellington College in Berkshire and the Royal Military College, Sandhurst.

Military career
Wilson was commissioned into the Cheshire Regiment in 1901. He transferred to the 117th Mahrattas in 1904 and subsequently to the 114th Mahrattas.

Wilson served in served in Mesopotamia during World War I, at the beginning of which he had been a student at the Staff College, Quetta, and was awarded the Distinguished Service Order, the Military Cross and the Croix de Guerre for his service. In 1926, he became Commander of the Wana Brigade, part of Northern Command, in India. Then in 1931 he was made Commandant of the Staff College at Quetta and in 1934 he became General Officer Commanding Rawalpindi District. He was appointed Military Secretary to the India Office in 1936 and Adjutant-General, India in 1937.

He was promoted to full General and became an Aide-de-Camp General to the King in 1940. He retired in 1941.

He was also Colonel of the 5th Royal Battalion of the Mahratta Light Infantry.

Family
Wilson married  Marian Blanche Florence Hollway, daughter of Lieutenant-Colonel James Clinton Hollway, in 1905. They had two sons and two daughters.

References

Bibliography

External links
Generals of World War II

 

|-
 

|-

1882 births
1966 deaths
People educated at Wellington College, Berkshire
Graduates of the Royal Military College, Sandhurst
People from Richmond, London
Indian Army personnel of World War I
Indian Army generals of World War II
Knights Commander of the Order of the Bath
Companions of the Distinguished Service Order
Recipients of the Military Cross
Graduates of the Staff College, Quetta
Commandants of the Staff College, Quetta
Cheshire Regiment officers
Military personnel from Surrey
British Indian Army generals